Diego Marani (born 27 April 1990 in Asola) is an Italian sprinter.

His best result at the international level was the 7th place, in the 200 metres final, at the 2012 European Athletics Championships held in Helsinki.

Biography
On 17 June 2012, in Misano Adriatico, he gets the pass, with his personal best of 20.77, for 2012 European Athletics Championships.

Achievements

National titles
He has won two times the individual national championship.
2 wins in the 200 metres (2013, 2014)

Progression
200 metres

See also
 Italian all-time lists – 200 metres

References

External links
 

1990 births
Italian male sprinters
Living people
World Athletics Championships athletes for Italy
Italian Athletics Championships winners
Athletes (track and field) at the 2013 Mediterranean Games
Mediterranean Games competitors for Italy